Carlos Daniel Jara Sánchez (born 1 September 1996) is a Mexican footballer who plays as a midfielder for Real Zamora.

References

1996 births
Living people
Mexican footballers
Mexican expatriate footballers
Association football forwards
Deportes Santa Cruz footballers
Juan Aurich footballers
Segunda División Profesional de Chile players
Peruvian Primera División players
Liga Premier de México players
Footballers from Sinaloa
Sportspeople from Mazatlán
Mexican expatriate sportspeople in Chile
Mexican expatriate sportspeople in Peru
Expatriate footballers in Chile
Expatriate footballers in Peru